Tales from the Vienna Woods (1931) is a play by Austro-Hungarian writer Ödön von Horváth.

Plot
The play is set in Wachau, Josefstadt, and the Vienna Woods just before the Austrofascist takeover. It tells the fate of a naive young woman, Marianne, who breaks off her reluctant engagement with Oskar after falling in love with a fop named Alfred who, however, has no serious interest in returning her love. For this error, she must pay bitterly. Werner Pirchner composed the incidental music to the play.

Background
It was premièred in Berlin in 1931 and has been filmed several times. Before the première, the German writer and playwright, Carl Zuckmayer nominated the play for the Kleist Prize, which it won, the most significant literary award of the Weimar Republic. The play's title is a reference to the waltz "Tales from the Vienna Woods" by Johann Strauss II. Horváth's play premièred at the Deutsches Theater, Berlin. Written in the late 1920s during the period of catastrophic unemployment and the Great Depression, the play is a key work of modern drama, described by Erich Kästner as "a Viennese folk play accompanied by Viennese folk songs". It is a bitter satire about the mendacity and brutality of the petite-bourgeoisie, named ironically after the Vienna Woods near the Austrian capital that are so idealised in the waltz. In the play, Viennese Gemütlichkeit or "coziness" becomes a hollow phrase; the tragic, brutal story of the sweet girl Marianne and the deeply conventional butcher Oskar reflects the hardships and anxieties of the late 1920s during the global economic crisis.

Adaptations

Film 
The play was filmed for cinematic release in 1961 by director , starring Johanna Matz (Marianne), Walter Kohut (Alfred), Helmuth Lohner, Hans Moser (reprising his role of Marianne's father from the 1931 Berlin premiere), Helmut Qualtinger (Oskar) and Jane Tilden (Valerie), among others. Another version was made for television in 1964, directed by Michael Kehlmann.

Légendes de la forêt viennoise (1993) directed by 
Geschichten aus dem Wiener Wald (1999) directed by Martin Kušej
Geschichten aus dem Wienerwald (2013) directed by Herbert Fottinger and Andre Turnheim.

Opera 
Tales from the Vienna Woods, a 2014 opera by composer HK Gruber to a libretto by Michael Sturminger. It premiered at the Bregenz Festival under the direction of the librettist and the baton of the composer.

Stage
Christopher  Hampton, who had provided the English translation of the play for Maximilian Schell's London production of January 1977, used von Horváth as a character in his 1983 play Tales from Hollywood to draw parallels between Austrian society of the 1930s, as depicted in von Horváth's original work, and Hollywood's treatment of film-makers escaping from European fascism to find work in the American entertainment industry.

References

External links
Playtext, from Project Gutenberg 

1931 plays
Austrian plays
Satirical plays
Plays set in Vienna
Austrian plays adapted into films
Plays adapted into operas
Plays set in the 1920s
Vienna Woods